TOM, or methylthio-methyl-methoxyamphetamine, is a series of lesser-known psychedelic drugs and substituted amphetamines with the molecular formula C12H19NOS. 2-TOM and 5-TOM are the 2- and 5-methylthio analogs of 2,5-dimethoxy-4-methylamphetamine (DOM), respectively. They were first synthesized by Alexander Shulgin and described in his book PiHKAL.  Very little is known about their dangers or toxicity.

2-TOM

Dosage: 60–100 mg
Duration: 8–10 hours
Effects: strong closed-eye visuals upon listening to music

5-TOM

Dosage: 30–50 mg
Duration: 6–10 hours
Effects: open and closed-eye visuals, psychedelia, hallucinations

See also 
 Phenethylamine
 TOMSO

References 

Substituted amphetamines